Catching Feelings is a 2017 South African romantic drama film written, co-produced and directed by Kagiso Lediga. It stars Lediga, Pearl Thusi, Andrew Buckland, Akin Omotoso, Precious Makgaretsa, Kate Liquorish, Tessa Jubber and Loyiso Gola. The film was released on 9 March 2018, by United International Pictures and Ster-Kinekor. The film was available to stream worldwide on 18 May 2018, by Netflix.

Plot
The film follows the story of an "urbane young academic and his beautiful wife, as their lives get turned upside down when a celebrated and hedonistic older writer moves into their Johannesburg home with them".

Cast
Kagiso Lediga as Max Matsane
Pearl Thusi as Samkelo
Akin Omotoso as Joel
Precious Makgaretsa as Lazola Yoko
Andrew Buckland as Heiner Miller
Zandile Tisani as Kabelo
Kate Liquorish as Tabitha
Tyson Cross as Miles
Tessa Jubber as Nicole
Loyiso Gola as Zweli

Production
The film was shot in Cape Town and Johannesburg, South Africa, in 2016. It is dedicated to the memory of John Volmink, a South African filmmaker who died in 2017.

Release
The film premiered at the 2017 Los Angeles Film Festival on 18 June 2017. The film was released on 9 March 2018 in South Africa. On 18 May 2018, the film was available to stream worldwide on Netflix.

Reception
The film has received favorable reviews from critics. On the review aggregator website, Rotten Tomatoes, the film holds an approval rating of 100% based on 7 reviews, with a weighted average of 7.25/10.

Film critic Phumlani S. Langa of City Press South Africa gave the film four stars out of five, saying "Lediga and Thusi both deliver solid performances in this classy and stylish production. This is probably my favourite Thusi pic. [It] plays a little like a personal classic, [Woody Allen's] Midnight in Paris, without the fantasy aspect. Honestly, it's local and lekker."

References

External links 

2017 films
2017 romantic drama films
2010s English-language films
Films shot in South Africa
English-language Netflix original films
English-language South African films
South African romantic drama films